Delmadinone (INN) is a steroidal progestin which was never marketed. An acylated derivative, delmadinone acetate, is used in veterinary medicine.

While delmadinone is sometimes used as a synonym for delmadinone acetate, it usually refers to delmadinone acetate, not delmadinone.

See also
 Delmadinone acetate

References

Acetate esters
Organochlorides
Pregnanes
Progestogens